Two Faced is the first full-length studio album by Swedish band Burst.

Track listing

1998 debut albums
Burst (band) albums